The Bradford Bulls are a rugby league club from Bradford, West Yorkshire, England.

Bradford Bulls may also refer to
 Bradford Rattlers a junior ice hockey club from Bradford, Ontario, Canada formerly known as the Bradford Bulls
 Bradford Bulls (2012–) another junior ice hockey club from Bradford, Ontario, Canada